Super Dave may refer to: 

Super Dave Osborne, a fictional stuntman played by Bob Einstein
Super Dave (TV series), a variety show starring Osborne
Super Dave: Daredevil for Hire, an animated television series starring Osborne